The Elim Pentecostal Church is a UK-based Pentecostal Christian denomination.

History

George Jeffreys (1889–1962), a Welshman, founded the Elim Pentecostal Church in Monaghan, Ireland in 1915. Jeffreys was an evangelist with a Welsh Congregational church background. He was converted at age 15 during the Welsh Revival of 1904.  Alexander A. Boddy, Vicar of All Saints, Monkwearmouth, Sunderland invited him to preach at his International Pentecostal Convention in Sunderland in May 1913. Between 1915 and 1934, Jeffreys was extremely active as a revivalist, and preached to large crowds throughout the United Kingdom. The church was brought together, first as the Elim Evangelistic Band, but this was changed to Elim Foursquare Gospel Alliance when the Deed Poll was registered in April 1934. The name 'Elim' was taken from the account in the Book of Exodus, chapter 15, verse 27, where the Israelites, leaving the bondage of Egypt under the leadership of Moses, found an oasis called Elim: "Then they came to Elim, where there were twelve wells of water and seventy palm trees; so they camped there by the waters." This represented a place of refreshing and it was thought appropriate for a revival movement at that time.

Differences of opinion over Jeffreys' open espousal of British Israelism and disputes on church governance led Jeffreys to withdraw from the Elim Pentecostal Church in 1939 and to form the Bible-Pattern Church Fellowship in Nottingham, which founded other churches throughout England until the 1960s, but that now only continues as a small fellowship. The presidency of Elim then passed to George Kingston, a wealthy businessman who had founded many of the Elim congregations in Essex.

On the night of 23 June 1978, eight British missionaries and four young children (including a three-week-old baby) connected with the Elim mission in Rhodesia (now Zimbabwe) were bayoneted to death by guerrilla fighters in the Vumba massacre. Most of the women were raped. This brutal massacre in the Vumba and the ministry of Elim in Zimbabwe was commemorated in the 2017 book The Axe and the Tree by Stephen Griffiths.

Doctrine
Elim Pentecostal beliefs include: the Bible as divinely inspired; the three in one as the Godhead; the virgin birth of Jesus Christ and his complete humanity and sinless life, substitutionary atonement, bodily resurrection, heavenly intercession, the second coming of Jesus; the universal sinfulness of mankind; the work of the Holy Spirit in conviction, repentance, regeneration and sanctification according to Acts 2:38; the baptism of the Holy Spirit "with signs following"; that salvation is received by faith alone and evidenced by the fruit of the Spirit. The baptism of believers by immersion and Communion are held to be ordinances.

Organization
Elim represents a global network of 647 churches in the UK and Ireland, and 4,143 Elim or Elim affiliated churches overseas, with a weekly attendance of about 50,000 in the UK and 319,000 overseas, operating in some 50 countries worldwide. Kensington Temple in London is the largest church in the denomination. Elim missions exist in 35 countries with hospitals, orphanages, and schools. The church operates Regents Theological College in Malvern, Worcestershire, where the movement's headquarters are also based.

The authority of governance of the church is rested in the annual conference. Guidance of the denomination is placed in the National Leadership Team and the General Superintendent between sessions. Chris Cartwright has served as General Superintendent since 2016, superseding John Glass. Elim headquarters is in Malvern, alongside its Bible College. Elim became a founding member of the Pentecostal Churches of the United Kingdom in 1998. It has been a member of the Evangelical Alliance for many years.

Though the local congregations are commonly and popularly known as Elim Pentecostal Churches, the legal name of the denomination is still Elim Foursquare Gospel Alliance, which is based on the church's stand for four fundamental claims – "Jesus Christ as the Saviour, Healer, Baptiser in the Holy Spirit, and Coming King."

Hymnal
The standard hymnal of the Elim Church was the Redemption Hymnal. Today however, the music and worship is mainly modern and contemporary worship songs with some traditional hymns alongside. Now Elim has its own Worship Department writing songs and training worship teams called "Elim Sound".

Churches
Myrtle House, in Llanelli, Wales

References

External links
Elim Pentecostal Church in the United Kingdom (official website)
Elim Pentecostal Church in Ireland (official website)
Elim Pentecostal Church in Canada (official website)
Elim Pentecostal Church in America (official website) 
Elim Pentecostal Church in Australia (official website)
Elim Pentecostal Church in New Zealand (official website)
Elim Pentecostal Church in South Africa (official website)
Elim Pentecostal Church in Ghana (official website)
Elim Pentecostal Church in Singapore (official website)
Elim Pentecostal Missions (official website)

 
Christian organizations established in 1915
Pentecostal denominations established in the 20th century
Pentecostal denominations in the United Kingdom
Finished Work Pentecostals
Protestantism in Ireland